The Przygodzice Radziwiłł Family Fee Tail (Polish: Ordynacja Przygodzicka Radziwiłłów) was a fee tail established in the Prussian Partition of Poland by Prince Michał Hieronim Radziwiłł for his son Antoni Henryk Radziwiłł in 1873. It was owned by the Radziwiłł family until the end of World War II.

Ortynats of the Estate
Antoni Henryk Radziwiłł, I ordynat
Bogusław Fryderyk Radziwiłł, II ordynat, son of the previous
Ferdynand Radziwiłł, III ordynat, son of the previous
Michał Radziwiłł Rudy, IV ordynat, son of the previous

See also
 Radziwiłł Family Fee Tail
 Antonin, Ostrów Wielkopolski County
 Przygodzice (Greater Poland)

External links
 http://www.wastan.pl/radziwil.htm

Radziwiłł family
Legal history of Poland
Economic history of Poland